Legislative elections were held in France to on 20 February and 5 March 1876 to elect the members of the Chamber of Deputies, the lower chamber of the National Assembly. They were the first elections under the French Constitutional Laws of 1875.

The result was a victory for the Republicans. President Patrice MacMahon subsequently invited Jules Simon, who declared himself "resolutely republican and resolutely conservative", to form a government, but dismissed him on 16 May 1877, precipitating the Seize Mai crisis and further elections.

Results

See also
1876 French legislative election in Algeria

References

External links
Map of Deputies elected in 1876 according to their group in the House, including overseas (in french)

Legislative elections in France
France
Legislative
France
France